Ləkit Malax (also, Lekit Malakh) is a village and municipality in the Qakh Rayon of Azerbaijan.  It has a population of 127.

References 

Populated places in Qakh District